
Gmina Czechowice-Dziedzice is an urban-rural gmina (administrative district) in Bielsko County, Silesian Voivodeship, in southern Poland.

Villages
Apart from the town of Czechowice-Dziedzice, the gmina contains the villages of Bronów, Ligota and Zabrzeg.

Neighbouring gminas
Gmina Czechowice-Dziedzice is bordered by the city of Bielsko-Biała and by the gminas of Bestwina, Chybie, Goczałkowice-Zdrój, Jasienica and Pszczyna.

Twin towns – sister cities

Gmina Czechowice-Dziedzice is twinned with:

 Cortona, Italy
 Hiddenhausen, Germany
 Łomża, Poland
 Orlová, Czech Republic
 Rajec, Slovakia
 Slonim, Belarus

References

Czechowice-Dziedzice
Gmina Czechowice Dziedzice
Cieszyn Silesia